Local elections were held in Kericho County to elect a Governor and County Assembly on 4 March 2013. Under the new constitution, which was passed in a 2010 referendum, the 2013 general elections were the first in which Governors and members of the County Assemblies for the newly created counties were elected.

Gubernatorial election

Prospective candidates
The following are some of the candidates who have made public their intentions to run: 
 Charles Kirui - former Belgut MP 
 Prof. Paul Chepkwony - a former Moi University lecturer
 Sammy Chepkwony
 Jonah Keter - a former deputy chairman of Tea Board of Kenya
 Joel Sigei - a career provincial administrator.

References

 

2013 local elections in Kenya